Wolfgang Rott (born 28 November 1946) is a former field hockey player from West Germany, who was a member of the West-German team that won the golden medal at the 1972 Summer Olympics in Munich. He also competed at the 1968 and 1976 Olympic Games, where West Germany finished fourth and fifth. He played at club level for THC Mettmann.

References

External links
 

1946 births
Living people
German male field hockey players
Olympic field hockey players of West Germany
Field hockey players at the 1968 Summer Olympics
Field hockey players at the 1972 Summer Olympics
Field hockey players at the 1976 Summer Olympics
Olympic gold medalists for West Germany
Olympic medalists in field hockey
Medalists at the 1972 Summer Olympics
20th-century German people